Chirirbandar is an upazila of Dinajpur District in the Division of Rangpur, Bangladesh.

Geography
Chirirbandar is located at  - it has 42790 households and total area 308.68 km2.

Chirirbandar Upazila is bounded by Khansama Upazila on the north, Parbatipur Upazila in Dinajpur District and Saidpur Upazila in Nilphamari District on the east, Fulbari Upazila  and Kumarganj CD Block in Dakshin Dinajpur district, West Bengal, India, on the south, and Dinajpur Sadar Upazila on the west.

Demographics
As of the 2000 Bangladesh census, Chirirbandar has a population of 232409. Males constitute 51.43% of the population, and females 48.57%. This Upazila's eighteen up population is 114095. Chirirbandar has an average literacy rate of 96.6% (7+ years), and the national average of 99.9%.

Administration
Chirirbandar Thana was established in 1914 and it was turned into an upazila in 1984. 

The Upazila is divided into 12 union parishads: 
1 No.Nashratpur Union Parishad
2 No. Satnala Union Parishad
3 No. Fatejangpur Union Parishad
4 No. Isobpur Union Parishad
5 No. Abdulpur Union Parishad
6 No. Amarpur Union Parishad
7 No. Auliapukur Union Parishad
8 No. Saitara Union Parishad
9 No. Viail Union Parishad
10 No. Punotti Union Parishad
11 No. Tetulia Union Parishad
12 No. Alokdihi Union Parishad

The union parishads are subdivided into 145 mauzas and 142 villages.

See also
Upazilas of Bangladesh
Districts of Bangladesh
Divisions of Bangladesh

References

Upazilas of Dinajpur District, Bangladesh